Vallal is an Indian Tamil-language musical comedy film released in 1997. This movie is directed by Raj Kapoor. The movie stars Sathyaraj, Meena, Manorama, Goundamani, Senthil and Sangeetha. The film was remade in Telugu as Raayudu with Mohan Babu playing the lead role.

Plot 
Durairasu loves Madhavi but she doesn't reciprocate his love and marries her uncle. Once Virumandi and Madhavi's husband get into a fight. Unfortunately Madhavi & her husband passes away. So Durairasu does not marry anyone & devotes his life for Madhavi's daughter Chella kili. Because of this issue there was a break in the family, Thulasi who is Virumandi's wife and Durairasu's Sister  and he were separated. This made Virumandi very angry so he always wants to avenge. Durairasu save a girl Annam from the sea, who doesn't want to divulge her past. As time passes, Annam  gets closer into the family and Kamakshi Durairasu's mother asks Durairasu to marry Annam. And this creates a problem for Chella kili as she loses Durairasu's attention, she comes out of her family and stays in Virumandi's house. Later Thulasi explains the whole story to her and lets her go to her father. In the end Annam, Durairasu, Chella kili, Kamakshi, Chithapu live together happily.

Cast 
Sathyaraj as Durairasu
Meena as Annam
Sangita as Chella Kili
Roja Selvamani as Madhavi "Madhu"
Manorama as Kamakshi, Durairasu and Thulasi's mother 
Goundamani as Chithapu
Senthil as Worker
Lakshmi as Sister of Sathyaraj
Manivannan as Virumandi Brother-in-law of Sathyaraj (Villain)
M N Nambiar as Durairasu and Thulasi's father
Ponnambalam as Ponnambalam, Maternal uncle of Annam
Sanjay as Maruthu
Sabitha Anand as Annam's sister
Nizhalgal Ravi

Production
Shobana Vignesh, who had earlier appeared in Mahanadhi (1994), was initially selected to play a role in the film alongside fellow actresses Meena and Roja. The first promotional campaign however featured Sangita's name instead of Shobana, prompting Meena to attempt to leave the project citing potential reduced prominence owing to a third lead actress. The director subsequently asked her to stay on, assuring importance. After the release of the film, Meena criticised Raj Kapoor for his false assurances.

Soundtrack 
Soundtrack was composed by Deva and lyrics were written by Vaali.

Release
When the film was struggling with its release, it was Vijayakanth who helped the film in getting its release.

References

1997 films
1990s Tamil-language films
Tamil films remade in other languages
Films directed by Raj Kapoor (Tamil film director)